is a passenger railway station located in the city of Yabu, Hyōgo Prefecture, Japan, operated by West Japan Railway Company (JR West).

Lines

Station layout
The station consists of one ground-level island platform connected to the station building by a footbridge. The station is staffed.

Platforms

Adjacent stations

History
Yabu Station opened on July 1, 1908. With the privatization of the Japan National Railways (JNR) on April 1, 1987, the station came under the aegis of the West Japan Railway Company.

Passenger statistics
In fiscal 2016, the station was used by an average of 76 passengers daily

Surrounding area
 Maruyama River
 Hasamaji Satoyama Park

See also
List of railway stations in Japan

References

External links

 Station Official Site

Railway stations in Hyōgo Prefecture
Sanin Main Line
Railway stations in Japan opened in 1908
Yabu, Hyōgo